The 1938 Kansas gubernatorial election was held on November 8, 1938. Republican nominee Payne Ratner defeated Democratic incumbent Walter A. Huxman with 52.10% of the vote.

Primary elections
Primary elections were held on August 2, 1938.

Republican primary

Candidates
Payne Ratner, State Senator
Harold C. McGugin, former U.S. Representative
Charles W. Thompson, former Lieutenant Governor
Carl Newcomer

Results

General election

Candidates
Major party candidates 
Payne Ratner, Republican
Walter A. Huxman, Democratic

Other candidates
Jonathan M. Davis, Independent
C. Floyd Hester, Prohibition
Ida A. Beloof, Socialist

Results

References

1938
Kansas
Gubernatorial